Donato Mascagni (1579–1636) was an Italian painter of the Renaissance active in Florence, Volterra, Rome, Mugello, and Salzburg. He was a pupil of Jacopo Ligozzi. He is also known as Fra or Frate Arsenio because he joined the Servite monastery in 1605. He however obtained special dispensation through cardinal Gerolamo Bernerio to move to Florence and become a priest in 1609. His income from painting was used to support his family. After much travelling, he returned to Florence in 1630.

References

External links

1579 births
1636 deaths
16th-century Italian painters
Italian male painters
17th-century Italian painters
Painters from Florence
Mannerist painters
Servites